Informal group may refer to:
 informal group (taxonomy)
 informal group (society)